Anoka Technical College is a public 2-year technical college in Anoka, Minnesota.  It was founded in 1968 and is a member of the Minnesota State Colleges and Universities system.

History
Dr. Kent Hanson has been serving as president of Anoka-Ramsey Community College since 2013. Beginning July 2011, Anoka Technical College and Anoka-Ramsey Community College, which has campuses in Coon Rapids and Cambridge, are aligned under one president to better serve students in the northern suburbs of the Twin Cities.

Academics
Academic programs at the college generally fall into the following categories:

 Automotive
 Construction and Manufacturing
 General Education
 Health
 Horticulture
 Information Technology and Business

Anoka Technical College is accredited by the North Central Association of Colleges and Schools, Commission of Institutions of Higher Education. All programs offered at Anoka Technical College are approved by the Minnesota State College and Universities system, the Minnesota Division of Rehabilitation Services, and the state-approving agency of Veterans Education. The college was granted initial accreditation by the North Central Association on March 5, 1999.

Campus
The campus is located in the City of Anoka and partially rests on the eastern border of the City of Ramsey. The building is largely the superstructure of the old Char-Gale plant. The plant transitioned in the war effort to make tarps for the military during WWII. Periodic investments over time have transformed the building into a state-of-the-art technical college.

References

External links
 Official website

Education in Anoka County, Minnesota
Buildings and structures in Anoka County, Minnesota
Educational institutions established in 1968
1968 establishments in Minnesota
Two-year colleges in the United States
Anoka, Minnesota